Viola pubescens, commonly called the downy yellow violet, is a plant species of the genus Viola and is classified within the subsection Nudicaules of section Chamaemelanium. It is a widespread North American violet found in rich, mesic woodlands, and sometimes in meadows, from Minnesota and Ontario east to Nova Scotia and south to Virginia. V. pubescens produces two different types of flowers during the season, including chasmogamous flowers in the early spring and cleistogamous flowers summer through fall.

Similar-looking species include the round-leaved yellow violet (Viola rotundifolia). The two species can be differentiated by leaf shape and leaf margin. Additionally, V. pubescens has both basal and cauline leaves, while V. rotundifolia has only basal leaves.

References

External links

 Viola pubescens Photos, drawings, description from Nature Manitoba

pubecens
Flora of the Northeastern United States
Flora of the Southeastern United States
Flora of the North-Central United States
Flora of Texas
Flora of Wyoming
Flora of Eastern Canada
Flora of Western Canada